Eduardo Bettoni (born 27 July 1990) is a Brazilian heavyweight judoka. Competing in the 90 kg division he won a bronze medal at the 2012 Pan American Championships.

References

External links

 

1990 births
Living people
Brazilian male judoka
20th-century Brazilian people
21st-century Brazilian people